Grigorios Polychronidis (born 13 August 1981 in Batumi, Georgia)() is a Greek boccia player with a Paralympic boccia classification of BC3. His specific disability is Spinal Muscular Atrophy. 

He won the gold medal during the 2012 Summer Paralympics in BC3 mixed pairs along with Maria-Eleni Kordali and Nikolaos Pananos. He also competed in the 2004 Summer Paralympics in Athens and won the silver medal at the 2008 Summer Paralympics in Beijing. At the 2011 Boccia World Cup he won Gold in BC3 Pairs. 

At the 2016 Summer Paralympics in Rio de Janeiro, he was the flag bearer in Opening ceremony. He won two more medals in Rio, the silver at the Mixed Individual BC3 and the bronze medal at the Mixed Pairs BC3, along with Nikos Pananos and Anna Ntenta.

Polychronidis won two more medals at the 2020 Summer Paralympics in Tokyo. He was again second at the Mixed Individual BC3 and third at the Mixed Pairs BC3, along with Anna Ntenta and Anastasia Pyrgioti.

References 

1981 births
Living people
Boccia players at the 2008 Summer Paralympics
Boccia players at the 2012 Summer Paralympics
Boccia players at the 2016 Summer Paralympics
Paralympic gold medalists for Greece
Paralympic silver medalists for Greece
Paralympic bronze medalists for Greece
Medalists at the 2008 Summer Paralympics
Medalists at the 2012 Summer Paralympics
Medalists at the 2016 Summer Paralympics
Paralympic boccia players of Greece
Paralympic medalists in boccia
Boccia players at the 2020 Summer Paralympics
Sportspeople from Batumi
Sportspeople from Athens